White Oak is an unincorporated community in Upshur County, West Virginia, United States.

References

Unincorporated communities in Upshur County, West Virginia
Unincorporated communities in West Virginia